Giorgi Sardalashvili (born 26 May 2003) is a Georgian judoka.

In 2020, he took first place in the 50 kg weight category at the European Cup among young people in Antalya. A year later, he managed to win the first place in the 60 kg weight category at the European Cup (youth) held in Prague. Took second place at the European Junior Championships (60 kg) held in Luxembourg. Took first place at the World Juniors Championships (60 kg) held in Olbia, Italy. In 2022, he managed to take first place at the European Cup (youth) held in Málaga, Spain. At the tournament, Sardalashvili defeated Alejandro Prieto Simancas (Spain), Ricardo Pires (Portugal), Florian Boecker (Germany) and Luis Barroso Lopez (Spain) with ippons, and in the final he managed to defeat Japan's Keiji Tsujioka with waza-ari. In the same year, he took second place at the Tbilisi Grand Slam. At the 2022 World Juniors Championships, which was held in Guayaquil, Ecuador, Sardalashvili took second place.

He is a winner of a 2022 Zagreb Grand Prix bronze medal. He participated in the tournament from the second round, where he defeated Tajik Muamadsoleh Kuvatov. Which was followed by the defeat of Brazilian Matheus Takakisa at the next stage. After losing to French Maxim Merlin in the quarterfinals with waza-ari, he defeated Turkmen Hukaberdi Yumaev in the repechage, giving him a ippon. In the fight for the Bronze medal, he defeated the Spanish judoka Francisco Garrigós by ippon.

Medals
2022
  Grand Slam Abu Dhabi
  Grand Slam Tbilisi
  Grand Prix Zagreb

References

External links
 
 
 

2003 births
Male judoka from Georgia (country)
Living people
21st-century people from Georgia (country)